Sergey Vitalyevich Pushnyakov (born 8 February 1993) is a Belarusian professional footballer who plays as a attacking midfielder for Slutsk.

Career
During 2021–2022 he played in Indonesia for Persikabo 1973.

Honours
Minsk
Belarusian Cup winner: 2012–13

Spartaks Jūrmala
Latvian Higher League champion: 2016, 2017

References

External links

1993 births
Living people
Belarusian footballers
Association football midfielders
Belarusian expatriate footballers
Belarus youth international footballers
Belarusian Premier League players
Latvian Higher League players
Liga 1 (Indonesia) players
Expatriate footballers in Latvia
Expatriate footballers in Indonesia
Belarusian expatriate sportspeople in Latvia
Belarusian expatriate sportspeople in Indonesia
FC Minsk players
FK Spartaks Jūrmala players
FC Gorodeya players
Persikabo 1973 players
FC Slutsk players